Fernerkogel is the name of several mountain in the Austrian state of Tyrol:

 Lüsener Fernerkogel (also Lisenser Fernerkogl) in the Stubai Alps, 
 Rechter Fernerkogel in the Ötztal Alps, 
 Linker Fernerkogel in the Ötztal Alps, 
 Gleirscher Fernerkogel in the Stubai Alps